Hawaii Calls is a 1938 American film directed by Edward F. Cline, produced by Sol Lesser Productions and Bobby Breen Productions, and released by RKO Radio Pictures.

Cast
Bobby Breen as Billy Coulter
Ned Sparks as Strings
Irvin S. Cobb as Captain O'Hare
Warren Hull as Commander Milburn
Gloria Holden as Mrs. Milburn
Juanita Quigley as Doris Milburn
Mamo Clark as Hina
Pua Lani as Pua
Raymond Paige as himself
Herbert Rawlinson as Harlow
Dora Clement as Mrs. Harlow
Philip Ahn as Julius
Donald Kirke as Regon
William Abbey as Lonzo
Ward Bond as Muller
Birdie De Bolt as Aunty Pinau
Laurence Duran as Banana
William Harrigan as Blake
Ruben Maldonado as Solly
Aggie Auld as Hula Dancer
Cy Kendall as Hawaiian Policeman

Soundtrack
 Bobby Breen – "Down Where the Trade Winds Blow" (Written by Harry Owens)
 Bobby Breen – "Hawaii Calls" (Written by Harry Owens)
 Bobby Breen – "That's the Hawaiian in Me" (Written by Johnny Noble and Margarita Lake)
 "España" (Music by Emmanuel Chabrier)
 "Macushla" (Words by Josephine V. Rowe, music by Dermot Macmurrough)
 "Song Of The Islands (Na Lei O Hawaii)" (Words and Music by Charles E. King)

External links

1938 films
1930s musical drama films
American black-and-white films
Films directed by Edward F. Cline
Films set in Hawaii
American musical drama films
Films produced by Sol Lesser
1938 drama films
RKO Pictures films
1930s English-language films
1930s American films